Igor Smirnov may refer to:

Igor Smirnov (politician) (born 1941), president of the unrecognized Transdniestrian Moldovan Republic
Igor Smirnov (scientist) (1951–2004), controversial Russian mind control researcher

See also
 Igor Mirnov